Nusa Lembongan is an island located southeast of Bali, Indonesia. It is part of a group of three islands that make up the Nusa Penida district, of which it is the most famous of the three islands of Nusa Penida, Nusa Lembongan, and Nusa Ceningan - known together as the "Nusa Islands". This island group, in turn, is part of the Lesser Sunda Islands.

Administration 
Administratively, the island is part of Nusa Penida district of Klungkung Regency. Nusa Lembongan is one of three small offshore islands which make up this district, the others being Nusa Penida and Nusa Ceningan.  Nusa Lembongan has the vast majority of the tourist infrastructure within the district and is the most popular destination for visitors to the Nusa Islands as it has the most accommodation and dining options for travellers from Bali and Lombok.

Geography 

Nusa Lembongan is approximately 8 square kilometres in area with a permanent population estimated at 5,000.  Twelve kilometres of the Badung Strait separates Nusa Lembongan from Bali Island. The island is surrounded by coral reefs with white sand beaches and low limestone cliffs. Nusa Lembongan is separated from Nusa Ceningan by a shallow estuarine channel which is difficult to navigate at low tide. There are no permanent waterways on Nusa Lembongan. There is a suspension bridge linking Nusa Lembongan and Nusa Ceningan which takes foot and motorbike traffic only.

There are three main villages on the island. Jungut Batu and Mushroom Bay are the centres of the tourist-based industry and activities on the island whilst much of the permanent local population resides in Lembongan Village.

To the east, the Lombok Strait separates the three islands from Lombok, and marks the biogeographical division between the fauna of the Indomalayan realm and the distinctly different fauna of Australasia. The transition is known as the Wallace Line, named after Alfred Russel Wallace, who first proposed a transition zone between these two major biomes.

The north-eastern side of the island is flanked by a relatively large area of mangroves totalling some 212 hectares.

Nusa Lembongan is served by regular direct speed-boat services, mostly from the east-coast Bali resort town of Sanur. Crossing time is approximately 30 minutes and services run at regular intervals during daylight hours. Larger cargo boats also run daily from the Bali port town of Padang Bai.

The island is populated by very few cars. Its main source of transportation is by scooters and foot, due to the small size of the island.

Local economy 

The economy is largely based on tourism and Nusa Lembongan is the only one of the three neighbouring islands to have any significant tourism-based infrastructure.  Nusa Lembongan is particularly well known as a world-class surfing destination, with famous surf breaks including Shipwrecks, Lacerations & Playgrounds. The island is also known for its surrounding world-class Scuba Diving and snorkelling on the coral reefs. There is also subsistence agriculture and fishing on the island and used to be a seaweed farming micro-industry, until as recently as 2015, when due to tourism and pollution it became unviable.

The island also contains several guesthouses and even a small gym.

Conservation issues 

Marine conservation is considered extremely important to sustaining future levels of tourism on the island and in February 2009, a local NGO from Nusa Lembongan, facilitated by The Nature Conservancy Coral Triangle Center, opened a community centre on Nusa Lembongan. The waters around Nusa Lembongan and Nusa Penida have at least 247 species of coral and 562 species of reef fish.

Other conservation initiatives include a release programme of critically endangered olive ridley turtles from Sunset Beach on the southwestern coast.

References

External links

Islands of Bali
Klungkung Regency
Underwater diving sites in Indonesia
Populated places in Indonesia